Tapton Hall is a Grade II listed building situated on Shore Lane in the Crosspool area of Sheffield, England.

History
Tapton Hall was built in 1855, however on the 1853 Sheffield town plan a building known as Tapton Grove existed on the site. The date of the construction of Tapton Grove is unknown but it is known that Mary Shore (thus Shore Lane) lived in the house until her death in 1853. Mrs Shore was the Grandmother of Florence Nightingale and the young Florence often stayed at the house. Upon the death of Mary Shore in 1853, aged 96, the house was bought by Robert B. Mitchell who within two years had sold the house to the Sheffield steel magnate Edward Vickers.

Vickers’ first action was to demolish Tapton Grove and completely rebuild it in 1855 as Tapton Hall. Vickers used the architects Flockton & Son and the house was built in the Classical style with Italianate features. In 1867 the house was bought by George Wilson of the family of snuff manufacturers. Wilson paid £3,500 for Tapton Hall, plus £1,424 for the furniture and £218 for the wine left in the cellar. The hall was owned by the Wilson family until the late 1950s, being lived in by George Wilson’s son George Kingsford Wilson (1853–1933) and then his grandson George Ronald Wilson (1888–1958).

Soon after the death of George Ronald Wilson in 1958 the hall was purchased by the Masonic Hall Company of Sheffield who had plans to refurbish and extend the building. In 1959 the Masonic Hall Company held a limited competition and invited architectural firms to submit plans for large scale additions to meet highly specialised needs without detracting from the quality of the house,. The competition was won by the Sheffield firm of  Hadfield, Cawkwell, Davidson & Partners who restored and renovated the existing house providing specialised suites of rooms and a new 30,000 square foot extension. The new extension which was completed in 1967, was built in a contemporary style and has been described as “large and uncompromisingly modern”. It comprises two floors and includes four temples, dining rooms and kitchen to serve 360 diners. The extension is constructed in grey brick, ashlars stone slabs and precast concrete cladding. A large abstract concrete mural symbolising the turmoil and chaos of the outside by William Mitchell stands at the members entrance.

In 1969, the Irish historian Edith Johnston became the first Warden of Sheffield University's Tapton Hall of Residence and she served until 1971.

Present day
Today Tapton Hall is a Conference and banqueting centre which hosts wedding, civil ceremonies, corporate events and special occasions.

Architecture
The building is dominated by a large rounded two storey  bow window consisting of three sash windows on each floor. The hipped slate roof is concealed by balustrades. The eastern entrance has a two storey square porch. The interior has a grand entrance hall with an open well staircase with moulded segmental arches, modillion cornice and a roof light.

References

Houses in Sheffield
Grade II listed buildings in Sheffield
History of Sheffield
Houses completed in 1855